Anton Kavalyow (born 26 August 1999) is a Belarusian professional footballer who plays for Torpedo-BelAZ Zhodino.

Personal life
His older brother Yury Kavalyow is also professional footballer and Belarus international player.

References

External links 
 
 

2000 births
Living people
Belarusian footballers
Association football midfielders
Belarusian expatriate footballers
Expatriate footballers in Latvia
FC Shakhtyor Soligorsk players
FC Isloch Minsk Raion players
FC Torpedo-BelAZ Zhodino players